Good Vibes is a Philippine teen dance musical drama anthology series aired on ABS-CBN from April 3 to August 28, 2011 replacing Your Song. It stars Sam Concepcion, Enrique Gil and Arron Villaflor, with some of the teen housemates from Pinoy Big Brother: Teen Clash 2010, James Reid, Devon Seron, Ivan Dorschner, Yen Santos and Kazel Kinouchi, along with other newcomers Coleen Garcia, Linn Oeymo, Heidi Reigo, Chikara Nawa.

Overview

Synopsis
This story is about the two 17-year-old brothers Troy and Marc. Marc Pedroza (Sam Concepcion) is the school crush, valedictorian, the president of the school's dance crew, and he also has a perfect loving family. He has everything everyone envies of, but then he wants to prove to everyone that he can be more than what his parents want him to be. But in the story his usually perfect life turns out to be not so perfect at all as he finds out that his dad Nestor (Dominic Ochoa) has a son Troy Cabrera (Enrique Gil) out of wedlock. Within his dance group a scandal leaked which one of their teammates got their other teammate pregnant, they have no one to replace her so she carries on dancing even in her condition. At the end of one of their performances, the girl faints and the school teachers find out what has happened to the girl. Her and the boy get expelled and Marc being the head of the dance crew gets punished. The afternoon after, Marc finds out he has a half brother, whose mother has died due to an illness so Troy has to live with his father's family. Troy and Marc do not get along but they have one thing in common; they both love to dance. Eventually, Marc's dance crew find out Troy is a good dancer and invite him to join their team along with Geleen. There are rows happening between Marc and Monique as they have just broken up because Monique found out that Marc only courted her because of a bet. Ara and Marc are best of friends, but Ara truly loves Marc and wishes for the love to be returned. However, Marc tries to move on and uses Ara as an alibi to help him. Maribeth is being courted by Spencer and Gab, however, she picks Spencer and their differences help their relationship. They have a big dance competition against Ralion, who is the new guy courting Monique and later wins the competition. However, new twists happen between Spencer and Maribeth, Ara and Gab, Monique and Marc, and Troy and Geleen.

Cast

Main cast
Sam Concepcion as Marc Pedroza (The Good Son) – He is the legitimate son of the principal, the president of the dance troupe, and a candidate for valedictorian. Monique is his ex-girlfriend and is best friends with Ara but he's still in love with Monique and tries to get her back and in the end they get back together leaving Ara heartbroken. He soon gets along with his brother Troy, they become best buddies after all.
Enrique Gil as Troy Cabrera (The Illegitimate Son) - Solely raised by his mother. He becomes a rebel after the death of his mother and must now live with the family of his real father. He has a crush on Geleen but soon becomes her boyfriend. After all the things he has been through, Troy starts to be a good boy and is always there for his brother.
Arron Villaflor as Franco Mendoza (The Best friend) – The best friend of Marc who is practically part of Marc's family. He is well known in school but seems 'presko' with the girls. He fell in love with Marc's sister.
Coleen Garcia as Monique Castillejo (The Ex) – The ex-girlfriend of Marc who comes from a middle-class family of achievers, which is why she wants to become valedictorian. She has so many extra-curricular activities in school, soccer being her favorite. Since she broke up with Marc, she ignores him and always tells him to leave her alone but she still secretly admires Marc. She is still in love with him. Marc still loves Monique, and treats Ara as a friend only and never had deeper feelings for her. She becomes close to Ralion, but still, her heart belongs to Marc, and defends him from Ralion's bullying. In the end, Monique and Marc rekindle the spark in their relationship.
Yen Santos as Dayanara "Ara" Gonzales (The Secret Admirer) – She is a popular girl in the school who is secretly in love with Marc. She is a member of the dance troupe, but is not good at dancing. So she decided to be the manager of the group instead. At last she gave way for Marc to go back to Monique because Marc and Ara were not meant to be and never will.
James Reid as Spencer Ziff (The Sickly Dude) – He is the cousin of Franco who came to the Philippines from Australia. He came from a middle-class family, and in the story he will be involved with Maribeth Tamayo because he is in love with her. They become a couple later.
Devon Seron as Maribeth Tamayo (The No. 1 Pare) – A boyish girl who is also the childhood friend of Troy. She is secretly in love with Troy, but forgets her feelings for him eventually. She cares for her family and wants to earn money for them. She is also in love with Spencer and they become couple.
Linn Oeymo as Geleen Weiss (The Dream Girl) – She is an upper-middle-class girl who just recently stayed in the Philippines. She is a new student who loves to stay and live in the country. She became part of Sinag Diwa, and part of their barkada. Troy has a crush on her. She and Troy later become a couple. 
Ivan Dorschner as Gabriel Weiss (The Mysterious Guy) – He is an upper middle class guy who just recently arrived and stayed in the country. He is Geleen's twin brother that loves to create music that will help them through the competitions. He is also in love with Maribeth but gets dumped after all.
Kazel Kinouchi as Lea Carlos (The Queen Bee) – She is a rich and an 'alta sosyedad' girl who has a Mean Girl image in school. She is pretty but complains that no boys ever fall in love with her.
Heide Reigo as Jamie Sarmiento (The Romantic) – She is an upper-middle-class girl who visualizes love romantically, but then she is afraid to fall in love. She is a good dancer.
Chikara Nawa as Wowie Ogiya (The Gender Bender) – The upper-middle class geeky guy who seems act as weird. He is athletic, loves hip-hop, fashion, cooking, and other 'girly' things but a great dancer.

Supporting cast
Dominic Ochoa as Nestor Pedroza
Yayo Aguila as Amanda Pedroza
Kristel Moreno as Carmi Pedroza
Maribeth Bichara as Alexandra Torres
Sandy Aloba as Ms. Moreno
April Sun as Annie
Joe Vargas as Danilo
Eslove Briones as Jhong
Nel Gomez as Ralion
Justin Gonzales as Rob
Arnold Reyes as Melchor Tamayo
Kalila Aguilos as Anna
Che Ramos as Charlene Weiss
Kyra Custodio as Saicy
RR Enriquez as Gracia
Patrick Sugui as Dino
I.A. Dela Cruz as Ayie

Special participation
Farrah Florer as Troy Cabrera's mother
Ann Li as Lucy Ledesma
Javy Gil as himself

See also
List of programs broadcast by ABS-CBN
List of programs aired by ABS-CBN

References

External links
Official website

ABS-CBN original programming
Philippine teen drama television series
2011 Philippine television series debuts
2011 Philippine television series endings
Philippine anthology television series
Filipino-language television shows
Television series about brothers
Television series about teenagers
Television shows set in the Philippines